Carbonic anhydrase inhibitors are a class of pharmaceuticals that suppress  the activity of carbonic anhydrase. Their clinical use has been established as anti-glaucoma agents, diuretics, antiepileptics, in the management of mountain sickness, gastric and duodenal ulcers, idiopathic intracranial hypertension, neurological disorders, or osteoporosis.

Medical uses 
Carbonic anhydrase inhibitors are primarily used for the treatment of glaucoma.  They may also be used to treat seizure disorder and acute mountain sickness.  Because they encourage solubilization and excretion of uric acid, they can be used in the treatment of gout.

Glaucoma
Acetazolamide is an inhibitor of carbonic anhydrase. It is used for glaucoma, epilepsy (rarely), idiopathic intracranial hypertension, and altitude sickness.

For the reduction of intraocular pressure (IOP), acetazolamide inactivates carbonic anhydrase and interferes with the sodium pump, which decreases aqueous humor formation and thus lowers IOP. Systemic effects include increased loss of sodium, potassium, and water in the urine, secondary to the drug's effects on the renal tubules, where valuable components of filtered blood are re-absorbed in the kidney. Arterial Blood gases may show a mild hyperchloremic metabolic acidosis.

Methazolamide is also a carbonic anhydrase inhibitor. It has a longer elimination half-life than acetazolamide and is less associated with adverse effects to the kidney.

Dorzolamide is a sulfonamide and topical carbonic anhydrase II inhibitor. It is indicated for the reduction of elevated intraocular pressure in patients with open-angle glaucoma or ocular hypertension and who are insufficiently responsive to beta-blockers. Inhibition of carbonic anhydrase II in the ciliary processes of the eye decreases aqueous humor secretion, presumably by slowing the formation of bicarbonate ions with subsequent reduction in sodium and fluid transport.

Brinzolamide (trade names Azopt, Alcon Laboratories, Inc, Befardin Fardi Medicals) is a carbonic anhydrase inhibitor used to lower intraocular pressure in patients with open-angle glaucoma or ocular hypertension. It exists as a number of isoenzymes, the most active of which is carbonic anhydrase II (CA-II). The combination of brinzolamide with timolol is marketed under the trade name Azarga.

Diuretic
Some diuretics inhibit the activity of carbonic anhydrase in proximal convoluted tubules and prevent reabsorption of bicarbonates from renal tubules. Lowered reabsorption of bicarbonates results in decreased activity of the apical sodium hydrogen exchanger, causing diuresis due to retention of sodium in the renal tubules. Acetazolamide is a carbonic anhydrase inhibitor. Other examples are;
 Dorzolamide
 Methazolamide
 Brinzolamide
 Dichlorphenamide

CSF regulation
Carbonic anhydrase inhibitors may be used to reduce the production of cerebrospinal fluid (CSF) in the brain. For instance, a cerebrospinal fluid leak may initially be treated medically with this medication to reduce the volume of leakage, and promote healing of the fistula. Similarly, in Idiopathic intracranial hypertension, reduction of CSF production by the choroid plexi may reduce intracranial pressures and reduce symptoms of elevated intracranial pressure such as retroorbital headaches and loss of vision. The mechanism is thought to involve inhibition of carbonic anhydrase (CA) within the choroidal epithelial cells, reducing the production of protons which are necessary for the osmotic transport of water and ions which constitute CSF.

Epilepsy 
Acetazolamide is effective in the treatment of most types of seizures, including generalized tonic-clonic and focal seizures and especially absence seizures, although it has limited utility because tolerance develops with chronic use. The drug is occasionally used on an intermittent basis to prevent seizures in catamenial epilepsy.

The sulfur-containing antiseizure and antimigraine drug topiramate is a weak inhibitor of carbonic anhydrase, particularly subtypes II and IV.
Whether carbonic anhydrase inhibition contributes to its clinical activity is not known. In rare cases, the inhibition of carbonic anhydrase may be strong enough to cause metabolic acidosis of clinical importance. Zonisamide is another sulfur containing antiseizure drug that weakly inhibits carbonic anhydrase.

Sultiame is also an example of an anticonvulsant drug of this class.

Altitude sickness

At high altitude, the partial pressure of oxygen is lower and people have to breathe more rapidly to get adequate oxygen. This would normally be compensated by the kidney excreting bicarbonate and causing compensatory metabolic acidosis, but this mechanism takes several days. A more immediate treatment is carbonic anhydrase inhibitors, which prevent bicarbonate uptake in the kidney and help correct the alkalosis. Carbonic anhydrase inhibitors have also been shown to improve chronic mountain sickness.

Contraindications
Hepatic cirrhosis

Adverse effects
Loss of bicarbonate may result in metabolic acidosis.

In plants 
Ellagitannins extracted from the pericarps of Punica granatum, the pomegranate, such as punicalin, punicalagin, granatin B, gallagyldilactone, casuarinin, pedunculagin and tellimagrandin I, are carbonic anhydrase inhibitors.

References

External links